Apiomorpha is a genus of scale insect that induces galls on species of Eucalyptus. Galls are initiated by first-instar nymphs (crawlers) on new plant growth and, when mature, the galls exhibit marked sexual dimorphism. Those induced by females are among the largest and most spectacular of arthropod-induced galls whereas those of males are small and most are tubular. Apiomorpha is known only from Australia and New Guinea although its host, Eucalyptus, has a wider distribution into Indonesia as well.

Apiomorpha is currently classified in the Eriococcidae, but this family is not monophyletic.

Morphology

Like other scale insects, Apiomorpha is highly sexually dimorphic.  Adult females are wingless, have very small (or no) eyes, and their legs are short and stubby. A female remains within the gall she initiated when a crawler, mating through the small apical opening of her gall. She reproduces inside the gall and her tiny offspring (≤ 0.4 mm) escape through the same small opening. Adult females of Apiomorpha can range in length from 2 mm to 45 mm, depending on species, and can live up to five years as adults.  In contrast, adult males of Apiomorpha are small (about 1 mm in length) and winged. Like males of other eriococcids, they do not have a mouth and, instead, have an extra pair of eyes on the underside of their head (i.e., they have four eyes, two on top and two underneath). Males leave their galls as adults and search for females.  They are weak fliers and typically walk on their host plant looking for females before taking to the air. After leaving their gall, adult males only live about one day.

Species

 Apiomorpha amarooensis
 Apiomorpha annulata
 Apiomorpha attenuata
 Apiomorpha baeuerleni
 Apiomorpha calycina
 Apiomorpha conica
 Apiomorpha cucurbita
 Apiomorpha densispinosa
 Apiomorpha dipsaciformis
 Apiomorpha duplex
 Apiomorpha excupula
 Apiomorpha floralis
 Apiomorpha frenchi
 Apiomorpha gongylocarpae
 Apiomorpha gullanae
 Apiomorpha helmsii
 Apiomorpha hilli
 Apiomorpha intermedia
 Apiomorpha jucundacrispi
 Apiomorpha karschi
 Apiomorpha longiloba
 Apiomorpha macqueeni
 Apiomorpha maliformis
 Apiomorpha malleeacola
 Apiomorpha munita
 Apiomorpha nookara
 Apiomorpha ovicola 
 Apiomorpha ovicoloides
 Apiomorpha pedunculata
 Apiomorpha pharetrata
 Apiomorpha pileata (type species)
 Apiomorpha pomaphora
 Apiomorpha regularis
 Apiomorpha rosaeformis
 Apiomorpha sessilis
 Apiomorpha sloanei
 Apiomorpha spinifer
 Apiomorpha strombylosa
 Apiomorpha subconica
 Apiomorpha tepperi
 Apiomorpha thorntoni
 Apiomorpha urnalis
 Apiomorpha variabilis
 Apiomorpha withersi

References 

Eriococcidae
Gall-inducing insects
Hemiptera of Australia
Sternorrhyncha genera